The 2006-07 Milwaukee Bucks season was the team's 39th in the NBA. They began the season hoping to improve upon their 40-42 output from the previous season. However, they came twelve wins shy of tying it, finishing 28-54.

Draft picks

Roster

Regular season

Season standings

Record vs. opponents

Game log

Player statistics

Regular season 

|-
| 
| style="background:#FF0000;color:white;"| 82 || 64 || 34.7 || .437|| .352 || .780 || 2.9 || 3.0 || 1.2 || .0 || 13.5
|-
| 
| 33 || 2 || 17.7 || .349 || .279 || .550 || 3.9 || 1.4 || 2.5 || .3 || 3.6
|-
| 
| 66 || 66 || 34.2 || .553 || .200 || .577 || style="background:#FF0000;color:white;"| 8.8 || 3.0 || .7 || .5 || 12.3
|-
| 
| 35 || 19 || 33.0 || .427 || style="background:#FF0000;color:white;"| .419 || style="background:#FF0000;color:white;"| .886 || 2.2 || 4.5 || .9 || .0 || 14.0
|-
| 
| 54 || 8 || 15.6 || .474 || .000 || .467 || 4.6 || .5 || .4 || .6 || 4.8
|-
| 
| 41 || 0 || 10.5 || .433 || .346 || .844 || .7 || 1.3 || .4 || .0 || 4.1
|-
| 
| 5 || 0 || 5.6 || style="background:#FF0000;color:white;"| .571 || . || .500 || 1.0 || .4 || .2 || .0 || 1.8
|-
| 
| 66 || 14 || 14.7 || .383 || .365 || .787 || 2.9 || .7 || .4 || .3 || 6.1
|-
| 
| 30 || 0 || 5.7 || .365 || .375 || .636 || 1.0 || .2 || .1 || .0 || 1.7
|-
| 
| 5 || 0 || 2.4 || .000 || . || . || .0 || .0 || .0 || .0 || .0
|-
| 
| 68 || 0 || 11.6 || .367 || .321 || .860 || 1.8 || 1.0 || .4 || .1 || 2.7
|-
| 
| 81 || 53 || 31.0 || .548 || .158 || .641 || 5.4 || 2.9 || style="background:#FF0000;color:white;"| 1.4 || .3 || 14.7
|-
| 
| 53 || 53 || style="background:#FF0000;color:white;"| 38.4 || .465 || .382 || .829 || 3.7 || 2.3 || 1.2 || .2 || style="background:#FF0000;color:white;"| 26.7
|-
| 
| 27 || 2 || 9.0 || .349 || . || .300 || 2.6 || .5 || .2 || .2 || 1.2
|-
| 
| 67 || 44 || 22.7 || .490 || . || .582 || 5.7 || .9 || .3 || style="background:#FF0000;color:white;"| 1.0 || 4.4
|-
| 
| 39 || 17 || 25.2 || .470 || .337 || .820 || 5.8 || .9 || .6 || .3 || 11.8
|-
| 
| 68 || style="background:#FF0000;color:white;"| 68 || 36.4 || .446 || .346 || .855 || 4.8 || style="background:#FF0000;color:white;"| 6.1 || 1.3 || .1 || 17.3
|}

Awards and records

Transactions

Trades

Free agents

References

Milwaukee Bucks seasons
Milwaukee Bucks
Milwaukee Bucks
Milwaukee